Milagros was a Peruvian telenovela produced and broadcast by América Televisión in 2001.

Plot

The novel tells us the story of two rival families: Echevarrías and De La Torres. One of the main heads of this last family, the evil Lucrecia, hires assassins led by Leoncio Peña "Jaguar" to annihilate all the Echevarría's in a social gathering they were having: Raquel Echevarría's wedding with John Wilson. The massacre occurs and the Echevarría clan ceases to exist in the midst of fire and blood. But there were two survivors: Raquel and her nephew José Antonio. As a result of the beating and rape suffered by Raquel by "Jaguar" moments before the fire, she becomes pregnant with Melissa. After what happened, Raquel becomes a cold woman with a desire for revenge.

On the other hand, Rafael De La Torre, Lucrecia's brother and highest authority in the De La Torre clan, has an affair with the family's servant, who becomes pregnant and knowing that Rafael asks her to abort the baby, she leaves the house. of the family and gives birth in a convent. Minutes later, she dies, but not before asking the nuns to name the girl Milagros.

Over time, Milagros grows up and becomes a pretty, intelligent and enterprising girl, but she has a problem with her leg and finds out about her past. After Rafael's death in a car accident, he leaves in his will that his assets will remain in the hands of the bastard daughter he had, which causes great anger among the members of his family, especially Lucrecia, who was determined to get it all. At the same time, José Antonio is already an intelligent man and trained by his aunt Raquel, he infiltrates the De La Torre family, to begin with the revenge plan for the death of his family. But in his revenge he will find Milagros and love will quickly grow between them, even though a dark past is involved, full of death, pain and misfortune, not to mention the eternal confrontation between Lucrecia and Raquel, that will cause more than one misfortune around the protagonists. Finally, Milagros and José Antonio manage to be happy and end up getting married.

Cast 
 Sonya Smith ... Milagros de la Torre Vargas/ Chachita Vargas (Mother of Milagros)
 Roberto Mateos ... José Antonio Wilson Gómez / José Antonio Echevarria
 Yvonne Frayssinet ... Lucrecia De La Torre de Muñoz, Condesa de Santana del Sol (Main villain)
 Malena Elías ... Raquel Echevarría Romero V. de Wilson (Secondary villain)
 Juan Vitali ... Gerardo Bellido
 Roberto Vander ... Benjamin Muñoz, Conde de Santana del Sol
 Hugo Cosiansi ... Juan Bermúdez
 Karina Calmet ... Fernanda Muñoz De La Torre
 Virna Flores ... Lucía Muñoz De La Torre
 Gonzalo Revoredo ... Sebastián Muñoz De La Torre

Special appearance
 Alberto Isola ... Rafael De La Torre (patriarch of De La Torre family, died of car accident)

Reparto
 Regina Alcóver ... Teresa Rosas de Bellido
 Reynaldo Arenas ... Leoncio Peña 'Jaguar'
 Norma Martínez ... Coca Ferrari
 Mirna Bracamonte ... Blanca Rivera de San Martín
 Hertha Cárdenas ... Consuelo Rivera
 Ana María Jordan ... Carlota de Avalos
 Atilia Boschetti ... Micaela 'Chela'
 Paul Martin ... Martín Bellido Rosas
 Ana Cecilia Natteri ... Margarita Manrique
 Ruth Razzeto ... Rosa de Bermúdez
 Carlos Mesta ... Celso / Benito López
 Tatiana Astengo ... Irene Ramírez 'Body'
 Saskia Bernaola ... Rossy Bermúdez
 Renato Rossini ... Juan Bermúdez Jr. 'Juanito'
 María Pía Ureta ... Mariana Avalos
 Mari Pili Barreda ... Raquel Echevarría (joven) / Melissa Wilson Echevarría (Sister / cousin of José Antonio)
 William Bell Taylor ... Pablo San Martín
 Melania Urbina ... Macerena San Martín
 Jesús Delaveaux ... Jesús Rivera
 Rafael Santa Cruz ... Godofredo 'Godo' del Aguila
 Paco Varela ... Sergio Zarate
 Fabrizio Aguilar ... Renzo Malatesta
 Nadia Berdichevsky ... Silvia Zapata
 Milagros Cabanillas ... Marcela Cordoba
 Roger Del Aguila ... Felipe Guzmán 'Pipo'
 Irene Eyzaguirre ... Teodora Cardenas
 Marissa Minetti ... Claudia Rosales
 Andrea Montenegro ... Erika Zevallos
 Milene Vásquez ... Paloma Manrique
 Milagros Vidal ... Rene
 Bernie Paz ... Gringo Belauchaga
 Fernando de Soria ... Peter Farfán
 Fernando Pasco ... Rambo
 Rodrigo Sánchez Patiño ... Robin
 Carlos Tuccio ... Bernardo
 Javier Valdez ... Gabriel
 Javier Delgiudice ... father of José Antonio, brother of Raquel
 Ricardo Mejía ... Homero López Rabanal 'Gordo'

External links
Milagros in Internet Movie Database

Peruvian telenovelas
Spanish-language telenovelas
2001 telenovelas
América Televisión telenovelas
2000 Peruvian television series debuts
2001 Peruvian television series endings